The A. Grenville and William Davis Courthouse opened in 2000, and is located at 7755 Hurontario Street in Brampton, Ontario, Canada.

The court house is named in honour of Albert Grenville Davis QC, former Peel lawyer and his son William Grenville Davis, lawyer and former Premier of Ontario. It was designed by Zeidler Partnership Architects of Toronto.

It was built to amalgamate several smaller Peel Region courthouses and the extensive library of the Peel Law Association into one building. The building houses branches of the Ontario Superior Court of Justice and the Ontario Court of Justice. There are 50 courtrooms on floors one to four and 38 jail cells attached to the Sally port in the basement.

2014 shooting 

On Friday March 28, 2014 at approximately 11 a.m. the A. Grenville and William G. Davis courthouse erupted in pandemonium when an armed individual by the name of Charnjit Bassi who went by the nickname of "Sonny", according to Ontario's Special Investigation Unit of Brampton was dressed in a long camel trenchcoat, a fedora and sunglasses and proceeded to walk into the front entrance of the A. Grenville & William G. Davis Courthouse at 7755 Hurontario Street in Brampton, Ontario attempting to enter the courthouse and bypassing the metal detectors by walking through the designated lawyers and staff entrance resulting in an altercation with 53-year-old Mike Klaranbeek who is a 30-year Peel Regional police veteran. After being told to follow instructions and to walk through the metal detectors, the alleged shooter, Charanjit Bassi pulled a handgun out of his holster and shortly opened fire letting off six shots and wounding the officer in the abdomen who was doing security checks at the time. Two police officers who were present on the scene responded immediately to the situation and returned fire fatally killing the 45-year-old suspected shooter on the corridor floors in the front lobby. Constable Mike Klaranbeek was rushed to Sunnybrook Hospital where he remained in stable condition. Peel Police believe that the motive for the crime was that Charnjit Bassi was targeting someone he believed to be present in the courthouse at the time. According to court records, Bassi had no outstanding charges and was not scheduled to appear at the A Grenville and William G. Davis courthouse on March 28, 2014 when the incident had occurred. Charnjit Bassi was well known to Peel Regional Police and was believed to be associated in the drug trade despite being not being convicted of any drug convictions although had past allegations which involved weapons. The courthouse was placed under lockdown for several hours after the incident occurred and all legal proceedings that were to take place that day were cancelled following the shooting. According to neighbours and friends of Bassi, he was a "gentle soul" and they couldn't understand what would drive him to such ends and claimed that the incident was astongishly out of character.. Neighbours reported that he had a trucking business but sources reported that he was officially unemployed for the last five years. Neighbours described him as a quiet and decent man and neighbours often witnessed seeing Bassi on his front driveway playing with his children.

High profile trials
 the murder of Mauricio Castro, a high-profile Canadian cocaine trafficker, murder near the centre court of Square One Shopping Centre;

See also

 Peel County Courthouse and Jail

References

Buildings and structures in Brampton
Courthouses in Canada